The 2007–08 Purdue Boilermakers men's basketball team represented Purdue University. The head coach was Matt Painter, then in his 3rd season with the Boilers. The Boilers did well at home, going 9-0 in the Big Ten and losing only a single home game overall (16-1). Purdue finished second in the Big Ten with a 15–3 record. They lost to Illinois in the first round of the Big Ten tournament despite having a #2 seed. The Boilers accepted a bid to the NCAA Tournament where they made it to the second round before losing to Xavier, 78–85.

Roster

Results

See also
2008 NCAA Division I men's basketball tournament
2007-08 NCAA Division I men's basketball season
2007-08 NCAA Division I men's basketball rankings
2007–08 Big Ten Conference men's basketball season

Notes
 The 25 wins were the most for Purdue since Gene Keady's 1997-98 team, when Purdue went 28–8.

References

Purdue Boilermakers
Purdue Boilermakers men's basketball seasons
Big Ten men's basketball tournament championship seasons
Purdue
Purd
Purd